Rhine-Ruhr (German: Metropolregion Rhein-Ruhr, also called Rhein-Ruhr-Region or simply Rhein-Ruhr) usually refers to the Rhine-Ruhr Metropolitan Region in Western Germany. It may also refer to:

 the Rhein-Ruhr-Marathon
 the Verkehrsverbund Rhein-Ruhr 
 the Rhein-Ruhr S-Bahn
 the RheinRuhrZentrum - RRZ
 RRI Rhein Ruhr International GmbH, a German engineering firm
 RR Rhine Ruhr (PTY) Ltd, an Australian engineering firm